Good Morning Starshine is the first studio album by pop rock singer Oliver released in 1969.

The title track hit #3 on both the adult contemporary chart and the Billboard Hot 100.  The album landed on the Billboard 200, reaching #19. The song "Jean" hit #1 on the adult contemporary chart and #2 the Billboard Hot 100.

Track listing 
 "Who Will Buy?" (Lionel Bart)
 "Oliver" (Oliver)
 "Can't You See" (Oliver)
 "Letmekissyouwithadream" (Oliver)
 "Ruby Tuesday" (Jagger/Richards)
 "Jean" (Rod McKuen)
 "Good Morning Starshine" (James Rado, Gerome Ragni, Galt MacDermot)
 "In My Life" (Lennon/McCartney)
 "Where Is Love?" (Lionel Bart)
 "Both Sides Now" (Joni Mitchell)
 "The Arrangement"

Charts
Album

Singles

References

1969 debut albums